The 15th Biathlon World Championships were held in 1977 in Vingrom, Norway.

Men's results

20 km individual

10 km sprint

4 × 7.5 km relay

Medal table

References

1977
Biathlon World Championships
International sports competitions hosted by Norway
1977 in Norwegian sport
February 1977 sports events in Europe
Biathlon competitions in Norway